Chang-ho is a Korean masculine given name.

Hanja
The meaning differs based on the hanja used to write each syllable of the name. There are 25 hanja with the reading "chang" and 49 hanja with the reading "ho" on the South Korean government's official list of hanja which may be used in given names. Ways of writing this name in hanja include:

: "prosperous and large". The same characters are also one possible way of writing the Japanese given name Masahiro.
: "prosperous and bright"

People
People with this name include:

Sportspeople
Kim Chang-ho, North Korean table tennis player
Choi Chang-ho (born 1964), South Korean boxer
Song Chang-ho (born 1986), South Korean football midfielder
Lee Chang-ho (baseball) (born 1987), South Korean baseball player
Lee Chang-ho (footballer) (born 1989), South Korean football midfielder
Ri Chang-ho (born 1990), North Korean football defender

Other
Ahn Changho (1878–1938), Korean independence activist
Cho Chang-ho (soldier) (1930–2006), South Korean soldier held prisoner in North Korea for 43 years
Bae Chang-ho (born 1953), South Korean film director
Chung Chang-ho (born 1967), South Korean judge on the International Criminal Court
Kim Chang-ho (climber) (1969–2018), South Korean mountain climber
Cho Chang-ho (film director) (born 1972), South Korean film director
Lee Chang-ho (born 1975), South Korean professional Go player

See also
List of Korean given names

References

Korean masculine given names